Pakupaku is an extinct genus of vase-shaped microfossil that lived in Australia during the Tonian period. The type species is Pakupaku kabin.

References 

Fossil taxa described in 2018